Ratner may refer to:
 Ratner's, a Jewish restaurant in New York City
 the Ratner Group, a specialty retail jeweler, now Signet Jewelers

Persons with the surname Ratner:
 A. Mark Ratner (born 1948), American game designer
 Ann Rachel Ratner (later Miller, 1921–2006), American sociologist and demographer
 Bill Ratner (born 1947), American voice actor
 Brett Ratner (born 1969), American filmmaker and music video director
 Bruce Ratner (born 1945), American real estate developer
 Carl Ratner (born 1943), American psychologist
 Ellen Ratner, American radio talk show host, news analyst on Fox News
 Gerald Ratner (born 1949), British businessman, former chief executive of the Ratner Group
 Iosif Ratner (1901–1953), Soviet general
 Leonard G. Ratner (1916–2011), American musicologist
 Marina Ratner (1938–2017), American mathematician
 Mark Ratner (born 1942), American physical chemist
 Max Ratner (1907-1995), American real estate developer 
 Michael Ratner (1943–2016), American attorney and human rights activist
 Payne Ratner (1896–1974), American politician, 28th Governor of Kansas

See also 
 Gerald Ratner Athletics Center
 Ratner's Star, a novel by Don DeLillo
 Ratner's theorems in ergodic theory proved by Marina Ratner
 Rattner